Barbodes tras is an extinct species of cyprinid fish endemic to Lake Lanao in Mindanao, Philippines.  This species could reach a length of  SL.

References 

Barbodes
Freshwater fish of the Philippines
Endemic fauna of the Philippines
Fauna of Mindanao
Fish described in 1926